Los Buellis Hills are a short sub−range of hills in the northwestern Diablo Range, in the South Bay region of the San Francisco Bay Area, within Santa Clara County, California.

Geography
The hills are located east of the Berryessa community in northeastern San Jose, and slightly west of Felter Road.

The hills support a non-native grassland habitat, and are used primarily for cattle grazing. High-voltage transmission lines pass through the hills.

See also

References

Diablo Range
Mountain ranges of Santa Clara County, California
Geography of San Jose, California
Hills of California
Mountain ranges of Northern California